José María Ignacio Montes de Oca y Obregón was a Mexican archbishop.

Sources
  Catholic Hierarchy

References 

19th-century Roman Catholic bishops in Mexico
1840 births
1921 deaths